I Do It may refer to:
 "I Do It" (Big Sean song), 2011
 "I Do It" (2 Chainz song), 2013
 "I Do It" (Lil Wayne song), 2020